The history of Venezuela during World War II is marked by dramatic change to the country's economy, military, and society. At the beginning of World War II in 1939, Venezuela was the world's leading oil exporter, and subsequently one of the main beneficiaries of the American Lend-Lease programs. Economic assistance from the United States, as well a booming oil industry, led Venezuela to become one of the few Latin American countries that was able to finance its own modernization in the post-war era. Furthermore, through skillful diplomacy, Venezuela was able to gain territory, increase its share in oil profits, and also reduce its reliance on foreign oil companies.

Although Venezuela was officially neutral for most of the war, it secretly supported the Allies, and eventually declared war on the Axis powers in February 1945, a few months before the end of the conflict.

History

The oil industry
According to author Thomas M. Leonard, Venezuela's oil garnered "intense interest" from the Allies and the Axis, both before and during World War II. Thus, Venezuela's main strategic goal from 1939 to 1945 was to protect its oil from being seized by a belligerent nation. Closely related to this goal was the need to market oil, which had become the mainstay of the Venezuelan economy. Leonard says that the war could, ideally, have resulted in an "economic boom" if Venezuela could maintain a policy of strict neutrality and sell oil to both sides. However, neither the Axis or the Allies were likely to tolerate such a situation, and in the end, Venezuela sided with the Allies.

Even though Venezuela was decidedly pro-Allied, the government attempted to increase its hold on the oil market, which was dominated by American-owned petroleum firms. One option was to nationalize the oil industry, like Mexico did in 1938. This option, however, was never seriously considered, because nationalizing the oil industry meant seizing American-owned oil, which would have likely resulted in a military intervention. Although Mexico's nationalization of its oil industry did not result in an American military intervention, just the possibility of one was enough to keep the Venezuelan government content with seeking a mere increase in its share of profits, rather than taking all of it.

Subsequently, the United States, eager to maintain its access to the oil, agreed to increase oil revenues for Venezuela. Profits were split fifty-fifty between the Venezuelan government and the oil companies, such as Standard Oil and the British-owned Shell Oil. As result, in 1944 Venezuela's oil income was 66% higher than it was in 1941, and by 1947 total income had increased 358%. This "largesse," as Leonard calls it, allowed Venezuela to become one of the few Latin American countries that was able to finance its own modernization in the postwar era, unlike many of the other states in the region, which relied on American economic assistance.

Axis influence
Nazi efforts to increase their influence in Venezuela, and thus access Venezuelan oil, date back to 1933, when Arnold Margerie formed the Venezuelan Regional Group of the Nazi Party, or Grupo Regional de Venezuela del Partido Nazi. After that, the Germans began "courting" the Venezuelan military through its military mission. On the "cultural front," according to Leonard, General Wilhelm von Faupel, head of the Ibero-American Institute, attempted to gain influence by sending his wife, Edith, to Venezuela to "extol the virtues of fascism." Germany was also active in countering American economic influence, by expanding its holdings in mining, agriculture, and railroading.

During the war, there were nearly 4,000 German immigrants residing in Venezuela. As result of which, there was fear among certain Allied leaders of a "fifth column" forming to commit sabotage and other acts against the Venezuelan government or oil-related infrastructure. The nearby British, French, and Dutch colonies also presented security concerns: If any were to fall under Axis control, they would certainly become bases for the interdiction of the Caribbean sea lanes, which carried Venezuela's crude oil to be refined in Aruba, and thence to market. They could also be used as staging areas for the invasion of neighboring countries, or for commando operations to interrupt oil production.

In 1938, the Venezuelan Navy purchased two  Azio-class minesweepers from Fascist Italy. Then in September 1939, Contreras declared the country's neutrality: Venezuela continued to trade with Japan and Italy for another year. Trade with Imperial Japan reached an all-time high in 1939. After the war in Europe began in September 1939, and after President Eleazar López Contreras declared Venezuela's neutrality, commerce continued with Japan and Italy, but trade with Germany ceased due to the British blockade. It was because of these circumstances some observers concluded that Venezuela would join the Axis if it were forced to take sides. However, the fear of Venezuela aligning itself with Germany, or any of the other Axis powers, was mostly unwarranted, because the sentiment of your average Venezuelan was "bitterly anti-German."

Koenigstein and Caribia
The SS Koenigstein and the SS Caribia were a pair of German steamboats that were used to carry about 300 Jewish refugees from Europe to Venezuela between February and March 1939. The Koenigstein, with eighty-six Jews on board, left Germany in January 1939 for the British colony of Trinidad, but when it arrived, the British refused to accept the passengers because of a recent prohibition on the admission of refugees. As result, the Koenigstein sailed to Honduras, but again the passengers were denied entry. With nowhere else to go, the Koenigstein then sailed for Venezuela, and arrived on February 17, 1939. The SS Caribia, carrying 165 Jews, went through a very similar ordeal. After sailing to British Guiana, Georgetown authorities refused to allow the passengers to land, and so the Caribia sailed to Venezuela, arriving on March 16, 1939.

At first, the Venezuelan government gave the refugees special permission to stay in the country temporarily, until new homes could be found for them in other Latin American countries, but they were banned from finding employment in any industry other than agriculture. Furthermore, the Venezuelan government made it clear that it would not accept any more refugees, unless they came through the proper channels. Later, President López Contreras gave the refugees permission to remain in the country permanently. As result of which, the passengers of the Koenigstein and the Caribia became some of the founding members of Venezuela's Jewish community, as most Jewish emigration to Venezuela would occur after the war, in the 1950s and 1960s.

The Venezuelan military
When World War II began, the Venezuelan military was badly in need of modernization, and the United States was eager to help in return for Venezuela's support in the war. However, the United States was concerned about a possible enemy attack on Venezuela, in order to disrupt oil production, if it did openly join the Allied cause and declare war. As result, the Venezuelan government broke relations with the Axis powers on December 31, 1941, but it did not declare war until February 15, 1945, when the threat of an attack against the oil was gone. Therefore, the Venezuelan military never met the enemy on the battlefield, although under the Operation Neuland a few Venezuelan merchant ships were sunk; the first of which called "Monagas" occurred during the German attack on Aruba in February 1942.

Because Venezuela was officially neutral for most of the war, the task of guarding the Venezuelan coast for enemy activity and escorting Venezuelan ships was left to the Americans. Accordingly, after the attack on Aruba, the United States Navy established the Fourth Fleet, which was responsible for countering enemy naval operations in the Caribbean and in the South Atlantic. The United States Army also sent aircraft and personnel to help protect the oil refineries and bolster the Venezuelan Air Force. To support the mission, Venezuela granted American ships and planes access to the country's ports and airstrips.

Gallery

See also

 Operation Bolívar
 American Theater (1939–1945)
 1945 Venezuelan coup d'état
 1948 Venezuelan coup d'état
 History of Venezuela

References

Military history of Venezuela
Venezuela
1939 in Venezuela
1940s in Venezuela
Venezuela
Wars involving Venezuela
Venezuela